Sino as a prefix generally refers to:
 China
 Chinese people
 Two Chinas
 Culture of China
 History of China

Sino may also refer to:

 Sino Group, a property company in Hong Kong 
 Sino (Café Tacuba album), the 7th studio album by Mexican rock band Café Tacuba
 Sino (Tamara Todevska album), debut album by the Macedonian singer Tamara Todevska
 Sino (name), a given name and surname

Prefixes
Sinoe≈ (as in  Sinodic period as well as and Sinu≈ as in sinus)